The Adventures of Brigadier Wellington-Bull is a short-lived black-and-white British sitcom starring Alexander Gauge and Valerie Singleton. Written by Austin Melford, only one series of five 30-minute episodes was produced.

Cast
Alexander Gauge – Brigadier Garnet Wellington-Bull
Valerie Singleton – Jane Wellington-Bull
Donald Hewlett – Captain "Sooty" Pilkington

Plot
The Adventures of Brigadier Wellington-Bull followed the adventures of a retired Army Brigadier, Garnet Wellington-Bull, who is trying to come to terms with civilian life. The other characters were his daughter Jane (played by future Blue Peter presenter Valerie Singleton) and Captain Pilkington, a young officer who used to serve under him.

Cancellation
Alexander Gauge, who played the Brigadier, died of natural causes  1960; The Adventures of Brigadier Wellington-Bull was one of his last programmes.

Episodes
Episode One (12 June 1959)
Episode Two
Episode Three
Episode Four
Episode Five (17 July 1959)

Further reading
Mark Lewisohn, "Radio Times Guide to TV Comedy", BBC Worldwide Ltd, 2003

External links

1959 British television series debuts
1959 British television series endings
1950s British comedy television series
BBC television sitcoms